Energy Procedia is a peer-reviewed scientific journal part of the Procedia series published by Elsevier. It is abstracted and indexed in EI-Compendex, Engineering Index, and Scopus. The journal publishes conference proceedings dealing with all aspects of research on energy.
The journal stands discontinued as of 2019.

External links 
 

Energy and fuel journals
Engineering journals
Elsevier academic journals
Publications established in 2009
English-language journals
Conference proceedings published in journals
Irregular journals